The following squads were named for the 1929 South American Championship that took place in Argentina.

Argentina
 Juan Pablo Bartolucci MF 09/07/1902 Huracan
 Ángel Luis Bossio GK 05/05/1905 Talleres de Remedios de Escalada 
 Juan Carlos Botasso GK 23/10/1908 Argentino de Quimes
 Pedro Jose Chalú MF 19/06/1906 Ferrocarril Oeste
 Roberto Eugenio Cherro FW 23/02/1907 Boca Juniors
 Alberto Cuello DF 23/09/1908 Tigre 
 Alberto Chividini DF 13/01/1906 Central Norte Tucuman
 Juan Evaristo DF 20/06/1902 Sportivo Palermo
 Mario Evaristo FW 12/10/1908 Boca Juniors
 Manuel Ferreira FW 22/10/1905 Estudiantes La Plata
 Alberto Fassora FW Atletico Tucuman
 Rodolfo Orlando Orlandini DF 01/01/1905 Sportivo Buenos Aires
 Fernando Paternoster DF 24/03/1905 Racing Club
 Natalio Perinetti DF 28/12/1900 Racing Club
 Carlos Desiderio Peucelle MF 13/09/1908 Sportivo Barracas 
 Edmundo Piaggio DF 03/10/1910 Lanus
 Juan Antonio Rivarola FW 13/06/1908 Colon de Santa Fe
 Manuel Seoane FW 19/03/1902 Independiente
 Domingo Alberto Tarasconi FW 20/12/1903 Boca Juniors
 Oscar Tarrío DF 14/04/1909 San Lorenzo de Almagro
 Adolfo Bernabe Zumelzú DF 05/01/1902 Sportivo Palermo

Paraguay
 Francisco Aguirre
 Delfín Benítez Cáceres
 Abdón Benítez Casco
 Antonio Brunetti
 Eusebio Díaz
 Diógenes Domínguez
 Romildo Etcheverry
 Salvador Flores
 Luis Fretes
 Aurelio González
 Lino Nessi
 Quiterio Olmedo
 Andrés Santacruz
 Porfirio Sosa Lagos
 Pasiano Urbieta Sosa
 Ramón Viccini

Peru
 Eduardo Astengo
 Daniel Breiding
 Juan Bulnes
 Alberto Denegri
 Mario de las Casas
 Plácido Galindo
 Jorge Góngora
 Agustín Lizarbe
 Antonio Maquilón
 Adolfo Muro
 Faustino Mustafich
 Lizandro Nue
 Rodolfo Ortega
 Jorge Pardon
 Julio Ramírez
 Miguel Rostaing
 Alfonso Saldarriaga
 Enrique Salas
 Eugenio Segala

Uruguay
 Andrés Mazali
 Pedro Arispe
 José Nasazzi
 Lorenzo Fernandez
 Alvaro Gestido
 Conduelo Piriz
 Gildeón Silva
 Antonio Cámpolo
 Hector Castro
 Pedro Cea
 Héctor Scarone

References

Squads
Copa América squads